Humbert III (1136 – 4 March 1189), surnamed the Blessed, was Count of Savoy from 1148 to 1188. His parents were Amadeus III of Savoy and Mahaut of Albon. He ceded rights and benefits to monasteries and played a decisive role in the organization of Hautecombe Abbey. It is said that he would rather have been monk than a sovereign. On the death of his third wife he retired to Hautecombe, but then changed his mind and, by his fourth wife finally had a son, Thomas. He sided with the Guelph party of Pope Alexander III against the Ghibelline emperor Frederick Barbarossa. The result was an invasion of his states twice: in 1174 Susa was set on fire, and in 1187 Henry VI banished him from the Holy Roman Empire and wrested away most of his domains, of which he was left only with the valleys of Susa and Aosta. He died at Chambéry in 1189. He was the first prince buried at Hautecombe. His memorial day is March 4.

Life and reign

Early life
Humbert III was born around 1136 in the castle of Avigliana, Piedmont, near Turin, to Count Amadeus III of Savoy and Mahaut (Mathilde), Countess of Albon and Vienne. Humbert III is an important figure in medieval society, as attested in the history of House of Savoy. His life was characterized by certain key features, including mysticism, borne of a vocation and tradition of the contemplative life, which came about in the events of his time as warrior and politician, which he undertook exclusively for dynastic reasons.

He inherited from his father, as well as from his grandfather, Humbert II, the dream of reconstituting the fragmented Kingdom of Burgundy, in stark opposition to the centralizing policy of the French royal family. In his efforts he was supported by Frederick I Barbarossa, and found himself induced to play a shrewd political subjugation of neighboring feudal lords or settled among his domains. Like his father, Humbert II, who died young when his son was a minor, Amadeus III entrusted the education of his own son, Humbert III, to Amedeus of Lausanne, former abbot of Hautecombe, and under his guidance the young Humbert made great progress in studies and spiritual formation, despising the apparent splendor of worldly things, and giving himself to prayer, meditation and penance. To better achieve his lofty goals, he frequently withdrew to Hautecombe Abbey, on the banks of Lake Bourget in Savoy, founded by his father. He always left the abbey with regret, every time the family and the Savoyard nobility called him back to occupy him with political matters.

Marriages
Amadeus III was a pilgrim in the Holy Land in 1122. He went there through the offices of Pope Callixtus II, and in 1146 he participated in the Second Crusade, and died on the island of Cyprus in Nicosia on 1 April 1148, where he was buried, leaving the twelve-year-old Humbert as heir. Although still at an early age, in 1151 Humbert was bethrothed to Faidiva, daughter of Alphonse Jourdain, Count of Toulouse. She soon died without issue. He later married Gertrude, daughter of Thierry, Count of Flanders and Sibylla of Anjou. This second marriage was annulled.

In 1164, Humbert married Clementia of Zähringen, by whom he had two daughters: Alice and Sofia. She died in 1173, and he decided to retire to Hautecombe, but not for long. In 1177, the nobility in 1177 convinced him marry for the fourth time. As wife, he took Beatrice, daughter Géraud I of Mâcon and Maurette de Salins. At last he had a male heir, Thomas, to continue the dynasty. Beatrice also bore him a daughter who died at the age of seven.

Reign
Humbert's reign was long. It lasted forty years, and was characterized by struggles with the Holy Roman Emperor, various lords and count-bishops. The main reason for conflict consisted in the patronage of the Bishop of Turin by Frederick Barbarossa, who dreamed of undisturbed dominance of the capital of Piedmont. This led to a gradual reduction of the possessions and authority of Humbert III on the Italian side, leaving him with the rump territories of the valleys of Susa and Aosta. In 1187, he was banished from the Holy Roman Empire by Henry VI for supporting the emperor's opponents. He did not retire, as has been said, to his Alpine domains, devoting himself in particular to the practice of personal virtues and fraternal charity. He also promoted the foundation of Precettoria of St. Anthony of Ranverso at Buttigliera Alta, not far from the town of Avigliana, entrusting it to Antoniani from Vienne, France.

Death
The death of Humbert III, March 4, 1189 in Chambéry, Savoy at the age of fifty-two, was mourned sincerely by all the people. He was the first prince of Savoy to be buried in Hautecombe Abbey, which has since become a burial place for the dynasty.

Veneration
The spirituality of Humbert undoubtedly blossomed in an environment of ancient Christian traditions, favored especially by the example of his father, a pilgrim and crusader in the Holy Land, and of his tutor, Amadeus, Bishop of Lausanne. However, Humbert's life was full of contradictions: He was a lover of peace, but had frequent hostilities and wars. He was penitent, ascetic, contemplative, but was forced to take the reins of government, during which time he had a life of action, and found himself forced in marriage in order to have an heir. However, he let unmistakable signs of great moral balance, severity with himself and indulgence and love of neighbor. He was a benefactor to churches, monasteries, and charitable causes, the care of the poor. Throughout his life, he supported Hautecombe Abbey. In 1188 he founded the Monastery of Sant'Antonio di Ranverso.

Humbert was venerated by many immediately after his death. Miracles were reportedly wrought through his intercession. In Aosta, he is depicted on the facade of the city's cathedral. He is mentioned by Alphonsus Ligouri as a particularly pious monk.

In 1838, Charles Albert, King of Sardinia and his descendant, succeeded in having him beatified by Pope Gregory XVI. The king's efforts on behalf of Boniface of Savoy, Archbishop of Canterbury, also succeeded. In Italy, Humbert is still remembered in particular at Racconigi, where the Royal Sanctuary of the Madonna delle Grazie houses a picture of him.

Family
Humbert had four wives:
1. Faidiva of Toulouse (d. c. 1154) daughter of Alphonse Jourdain, Count of Toulouse

2. Gertrude of Flanders (m. abt. 1155). The marriage was annulled, she was confined to a convent, later freed, and returned to the court of her brother, Philip of Flanders

3. Clementia of Zähringen (married 1164), daughter of Conrad I, Duke of Zähringen. They had two daughters:
 Sofia, (1165–1202), married Azzo VI of Este
 Alicia, (1166–1178), betrothed to John of England

4. Beatrice of Viennois and had one son:
 Thomas (born 1178)

Notes

References

External links 
 Umberto at Patron Saints Index

1136 births
1189 deaths
12th-century Counts of Savoy
People from Avigliana
Roman Catholic royal saints
Burials at Hautecombe Abbey